The 2019–20 Indian cricket season is the ongoing and 126th cricket season since the commencement of first-class cricket in India. The international cricket season started in September 2019 with South Africa's tour of India. The T20I series between the nations was drawn 1−1 while India clean swept the test-seris 3−0. India is currently hosting Bangladesh. India won the T20I series 2−1. India will play 2-match test series against Bangladesh which will include the first day/night test match to be played by either side. India will also host tours from West Indies, Sri Lanka and Australia. India will also host home games for Afghanistan which include tours from West Indies and Ireland. South African women toured India. India won the  WT20I series 3–1 and WODI series 3–0. Originally, Zimbabwe were scheduled to tour India in January 2020. However, in September 2019, India cancelled the Zimbabwe series following the ICC's suspension of Zimbabwe Cricket, with Sri Lanka replacing them.

The A-team season consisted of tours from Sri Lanka A and South Africa. Sri Lanka A lost the first class series 2-0 and drew the one-day series 2-2. South Africa A lost the first class series 1-0 and lost the one-day series 4–1.

Paytm retained the title sponsorship of international and domestic Indian cricket tournaments for five years.  BCCI partnered with All India Radio for radio commentary of all international and selected domestic games for 2019-20 and 2020–21 season.

The domestic season retained the same format of last year. The domestic season began with Duleep trophy and is scheduled to end in May with 13th season of Indian Premiere League. India Red won the Duleep trophy. Karnataka won the Vijay Hazare Trophy. India B won the Deodhar Trophy. The women's domestic season began in October with the T20 League and is scheduled to end in March with Women's T20 Challenge (Women's IPL). Railways won the T20 League.

International

India-A, India-B and India U-19 Teams

Domestic
BCCI announced the domestic schedule in July 2019. It largely retained the format of previous season with a total of 2036 domestic games being played across various age groups in the men's and women's category. The inter-state T20 tournaments added a semifinal stage after the super league stage. In August it was announced that Chandigarh cricket team will make their debut in the season after BCCI granted affiliation to Union Territory Cricket Association. Due to communication curfew after Revocation of the special status of Jammu and Kashmir, Jammu and Kashmir Cricket Association had to put TV advertisements on local TV channel to contact its players.

Transfers 
The following players transfers and staff changes were held during the season.

Men's

The men's season began in August with Duleep Trophy. India Red won the Duleep trophy, beating India Green by an innings and 38 runs in the final. The Vijay Hazare Trophy was played in September and October. Karnataka won the rain-affected final, beating Tamil Nadu by 60 runs to win the Vijay Hazare Trophy. The Deodhar Trophy was held in October and November. India B beat India C by 51 runs in the final to win the Deodhar Trophy. The Syed Mushtaq Ali Trophy is being held early in November and December to facilitate franchisees for the auction of Indian Premier League. The Ranji Trophy will start in December to February and will finish with knockouts being played in February and March 2020. Winner of Ranji Trophy will play Rest of India in a Best vs Rest format one-off match for Irani Cup in March. The men's season will end with the 13th season of IPL.

Women's

The women's season began with T20 League in October and November. Railways women defeated Bengal women by 8 wickets to win the T20 League for the record 9th time. It will be followed by T20 Challenger Trophy in January 2020. The One-Day League will be played in February and March. It will be followed by Challenger Trophy in March. The season will conclude with Women's T20 Challenge.

Junior Level

Similar to senior domestic schedule, the season retained all the tournaments and format of previous season across various age groups in the men's and women's category. Chandigarh will make its debut and were added to the Plate group (north zone for Vijay Merchant Trophy). Similar to Syed Mushtaq Ali Trophy, the women's inter-state T20 tournaments also added a semifinal stage after the super league stage.

International

Under-23 Men's One-Day Series vs Bangladesh

In September 2019, Bangladesh Under-23 cricket team toured India to play a five-match one-day series against India Under-23 cricket team. All the matches were played at the Ekana Cricket Stadium, Lucknow. Originally the series was scheduled to be held at Raipur but the venue was changed to Lucknow due to inclement weather conditions in Raipur. India Under-23 won the series 3−1.

Domestic Men's
Vinoo Mankad Trophy was held from October to November. Uttar Pradesh won the Vinoo Mankad Trophy. Vijay Merchant Trophy is being held from October to December. Men's U23 One-Day League is being held from October to December. Men's U19 One-Day Challenger Trophy is being held in November. Cooch Behar Trophy will be held from November to February. Col C K Nayudu Trophy will be held from December to March. Vizzy Trophy will be held in March.

During the season, BCCI also had to face serious issue of age fraud. In September 2019, former India captain and Junior team coach Rahul Dravid said that the issue is "Seriously detrimental" to the health of sport and "leads to an erosion of culture". BCCI relaxed the age fraud punishment during the second year of the punishment. Many BCCI member associations expressed shock over the decision. BCCI also started a 24x7 helpline for reporting the age fraud. Several players were suspended due to the age fraud.

Men's Under-23
The Under-23 age group will consist of Col C K Nayudu Trophy (Multi-day competition) and One-Day League.

Col C K Nayudu Trophy
Col C K Nayudu Trophy will begin on 11 December 2019. The league stage will run till 17 February 2020. The knockouts will run from 22 February to 14 March 2020. The tournament follows the group and knockout structure of Ranji Trophy.

Men's U23 One-Day League

Men's U23 One-Day League began on 31 October 2019. The league stage will run till 22 November 2019. The knockouts will run from 26 November to 1 December 2019. The tournament follows the group and knockout structure of Vijay Hazare Trophy.

League
Points table

Knockout stage

Quarter-finals

Semi-finals

Final

Men's Inter-University
The Inter-University competition will consist of sole Vizzy Trophy tournament (One-day competition).

Vizzy Trophy
Vizzy Trophy will be played from 19 March to 25 March 2020. In the tournament, the zonal teams will play a round-robin group stage followed by the final.

Men's Under-19
The Under-19 age group will consist of Cooch Behar Trophy (Multi-day competition), Vinoo Mankad Trophy (One-day competition) and One-Day Challenger Trophy.

Cooch Behar Trophy
Cooch Behar Trophy will begin on 22 November 2019. The league stage will run till 20 January 2020. The knockouts will run from 26 January to 15 February 2020. The tournament follows the group and knockout structure of Ranji Trophy.

Vinoo Mankad Trophy

Vinoo Mankad Trophy was stated to begin on 1 October 2019 but was changed to 4 October in the final schedule. The league stage ran till 26 October 2019. The knockouts ran from 31 October to 5 November 2019. The tournament followed the group and knockout structure of Vijay Hazare Trophy. Several cricketers from Bengal and Bihar were disqualified after caught of trying to do age fraud. Uttar Pradesh defeated Mumbai by 6 Wickets in the final to win the tournament.

League
Points table

Knockout stage

Quarter-finals

Semi-finals

Final

Men's U19 One-Day Challenger Trophy

Men's U19 One-Day Challenger Trophy is being played from 11 to 17 November 2019 at Hyderabad. The tournament was initially scheduled to be held from 9 to 15 November 2019. The tournament group stage will be round-robin followed by the final. A third-position play-off match was also added to the tournament. Nepal A under-19 team marked the comeback of an international team in the tournament after being absent last season. Nepal A Under-19 team replaced India Green Under-19. India Red, Blue and Yellow Under-19 teams were replaced by India-A, B & C Under-19 teams respectively.

League

 Top two teams advanced to the final

Third place play-off

Final

Men's Under-16
The Under-16 age group will consist of sole Vijay Merchant Trophy tournament (multi-day competition).

Vijay Merchant Trophy

Vijay Merchant Trophy began on 11 October 2019. The league stage will run till 20 November 2019. The knockouts will run from 25 November to 19 December 2019. In the tournament's league stage, the teams compete in round-robin groups (based on   Zonal Basis). The top two teams from each group will play in the knockouts. Several cricketers from Mumbai and Kerala were disqualified after they failed the age fraud test. Meghalaya's Nirdesh Baisoya took all 10 wickets in an innings in a league stage match against Nagaland.

League
Points table

Knockout stage

Pre-Quarter-finals

Quarter-finals

Semi-finals

Final

Domestic Women's
Women's U23 T20 League is being held from November to December. Women's U23 T20 Challenger Trophy will be held in December. Women's U23 One-Day League will be held from January to February. Women's U19 One-Day League will be held from February to March. Women's U23 One-Day Challenger Trophy will be held in March. Women's U19 T20 League will be held from March to April.Women's U19 T20 Challenger Trophy will be held in April. U19 T20 League and Challenger Trophy were initially scheduled to be held in October to November and November to December, respectively, but were rescheduled.

Under-23
The Under-23 age group will consist of One-Day League, One-Day Challenger Trophy, T20 League and T20 Challenger Trophy.

Women's U23 One-Day League
Women's U23 One-Day League will begin on 24 January 2020. The league stage will run till 15 February 2020. The knockouts will run from 19 February to 24 February 2020. The tournament follows the group and knockout structure of Vijay Hazare Trophy.

Women's U23 One-Day Challenger Trophy
Women's U23 One-Day Challenger Trophy will be played from 1 to 5 March 2020. The tournament group stage will be round-robin followed by the final.

Women's U23 T20 League

Women's U23 T20 League began on 12 November 2019. The league stage will run till 21 November. The super league stage will be played from 25 November to 1 December. The knockouts will be played from 3 to 5 December 2019. The tournament follows the group, super league and knockout structure of Syed Mushtaq Ali Trophy. Before the start of tournament, Bengal's selectors met with a road accident while going for the selection trial for the tournament.

League
Points table

Super League
Points table

Super Group-A

Super Group-B

Semi-finals

Final

Women's U23 T20 Challenger Trophy
Women's U23 T20 Challenger Trophy will be played from 11 to 15 December 2019. The tournament group stage will be round-robin followed by the final.

Under-19
The Under-19 age group will consist of One-Day League, T20 League and T20 Challenger Trophy.

Women's U19 One-Day League
Women's U19 One-Day League will begin on 19 February 2020. The league stage will run till 12 March 2020. The knockouts will run from 16 to 21 March 2020. The tournament follows the group and knockout structure of Vijay Hazare Trophy.

Women's U19 T20 League
Women's U19 T20 League will begin on 27 March to 19 April 2020. It was initially scheduled to be held from 31 October to 23 November 2019 but was rescheduled. The tournament follows the group, super league and knockout structure of Syed Mushtaq Ali Trophy.

Women's U19 T20 Challenger Trophy
Women's U19 T20 Challenger Trophy will be played from 24 to 27 April 2020. It was initially scheduled to be held from 28 November to 2 December 2019 but was rescheduled. The tournament group stage will be round-robin followed by the final.

References

Indian cricket seasons from 2000–01
2019 in Indian cricket
2020 in Indian cricket